Thelu or Mt. Thelu is a 6002-metre peak in the Gangotri range of the Garhwal Himalaya, Uttarakhand, India. Its immediate neighbour is the Sudarshan Parbat.

References

Mountains of Uttarakhand
Geography of Uttarkashi district
Six-thousanders of the Himalayas